The former Reidsville High School, also known as Reidsville Junior High School and Reidsville Middle School, is a historic school building located at Reidsville, Rockingham County, North Carolina. It was designed by architect Willard C. Northup and built in 1923.  It is a three-story, "L"-shaped, brick building with a combination of
Colonial and Classical Revival stylistic features.  A matching one-bay addition was built in 1941.  It features a two-story tetrastyle portico of Tuscan order columns and terra cotta trim.  It ceased use as a high school in 1960, with the construction of Reidsville High School and the building closed permanently as a school in 1980.

It was listed on the National Register of Historic Places in 1994.

References

High schools in North Carolina
School buildings on the National Register of Historic Places in North Carolina
Neoclassical architecture in North Carolina
Colonial Revival architecture in North Carolina
School buildings completed in 1923
Schools in Rockingham County, North Carolina
National Register of Historic Places in Rockingham County, North Carolina
1923 establishments in North Carolina